Eragrostis paupera is a species of flowering plant in the family Poaceae, native to the Gilbert Islands, the Phoenix Islands, the Line Islands and Hawaii, all in the Pacific.

References

paupera
Flora of the Gilbert Islands
Flora of the Phoenix Islands
Flora of the Line Islands
Flora of Hawaii
Plants described in 1924
Flora without expected TNC conservation status